The John J. Snyder House is a historic house located at 247 W. St. Charles Street in San Andreas, California. Built in 1895, the house was designed in the Queen Anne style; it has been called "one of the largest and finest" houses in the style in Calaveras County. The front of the house has a raised central entrance with a porch; the porch's frieze is made up of turned spindles. A slanted bay with a large circular window is situated next to the entrance. The house has a gablet roof with a smaller gable over the front bay; the small gable includes a fan-shaped window surrounded by a roughcast infill decorated with colored glass and stones.

John J. Snyder, the house's first owner, was an early settler of San Andreas who later became a district attorney in the area. Snyder lived in the house until his 1899 death. Snyder's wife Elizabeth lived in the house until 1938, after which the house became a rental property.

The house was added to the National Register of Historic Places on August 2, 1984.

References

External links

Houses on the National Register of Historic Places in California
Queen Anne architecture in California
Houses completed in 1895
Houses in Calaveras County, California
National Register of Historic Places in Calaveras County, California